Thomas Brodie-Sangster (born 16 May 1990), is an English actor. He is known for playing Sam in Love Actually (2003), Simon in Nanny McPhee (2005), Ferb in Phineas and Ferb (2007–2015), Jojen Reed in Game of Thrones (2013–2014), Newt in the Maze Runner film series (2014–2018), and Benny Watts in the Netflix miniseries The Queen's Gambit (2020), for which he was nominated for the Primetime Emmy Award for Outstanding Supporting Actor in a Limited Series or Movie.

Brodie-Sangster also grew in popularity for starring in critically acclaimed cult films such as Death of a Superhero (2011), Bright Star (2009), and as Paul McCartney in Nowhere Boy (2009). He played Jake Murray in the series Accused (2010–2012). He also had a cameo as an officer of the First Order in Star Wars: The Force Awakens (2015), a role as Whitey Winn in the Netflix miniseries Godless (2017) and voiced  John Tracy in Thunderbirds Are Go (2015–2020).

Early life
Thomas Brodie-Sangster was born on 16 May 1990 in Southwark, London, to Mark Sangster and Tasha Bertram. Brodie-Sangster's father's family is from Banchory, Scotland. He has a sister. Brodie-Sangster plays bass and guitar, and he learned to play left-handed guitar to portray the left-handed Paul McCartney in the feature film Nowhere Boy. He also learned to play the drums for his role in Love Actually (2003).

Career

In 2001, Brodie-Sangster's first acting role was in a BBC television film, Station Jim. He subsequently appeared in a few more television films, including the lead roles in Bobbie's Girl, The Miracle of the Cards (based on the story of Craig Shergold) and Stig of the Dump. He won the "Golden Nymph" award at the 43rd Annual Monte Carlo Television Festival for his role in the miniseries Entrusted. Brodie-Sangster's first major theatrical film was Love Actually (2003), in which he played Sam. He was nominated for a Golden Satellite Award and a Young Artist Award for his role in the film.

Brodie-Sangster next appeared in a television adaptation of the novel Feather Boy and played a younger version of James Franco's Tristan in the film version of Tristan & Isolde. Among other things, Brodie-Sangster takes part in a (child's) sword fight in the film. Brodie-Sangster next starred in the commercially successful film Nanny McPhee (2005) as the eldest of seven children.

In 2007, he appeared in a two-part story ("Human Nature" and "The Family of Blood") in Doctor Who as schoolboy Tim Latimer, and guest-starred in the Big Finish Doctor Who audio dramas The Mind's Eye and The Bride of Peladon. He also starred in the film adaptation of Valerio Massimo Manfredi's historical novel The Last Legion, released in 2007. That same year he voiced the character of Ferb Fletcher in the Disney Channel animated series Phineas and Ferb. He appeared in the 2008 miniseries Pinocchio, filmed in Italy, as Lampwick.

In 2008, Brodie-Sangster had a role in director Jane Campion's film Bright Star, a love story about John Keats and his lover Fanny Brawne. He also starred as Paul McCartney in Nowhere Boy, a film directed by award-winning artist Sam Taylor-Wood, about the teenage years of John Lennon.

Brodie-Sangster appeared as Casey in the film Some Dogs Bite about a boy who wants to keep his family together. Casey takes his baby brother out of foster care and, with the help of his older brother, goes in search of their father. Brodie-Sangster appeared in the Irish film Death of a Superhero, based on the novel by Anthony McCarten.

Additionally, Brodie-Sangster plays Liam in the 2011 film The Last Furlong. In April 2011, he made a guest appearance as Adam Douglas in an episode of British detective drama Lewis. In 2012, he starred in The Baytown Outlaws, in which he plays a young disabled man in a wheelchair, and in Ella Jones's short film, The Ugly Duckling, the third instalment of the Tales trilogy of reworked fairy tales from More Films. From 2013 to 2014, he played the role of Jojen Reed in the HBO series Game of Thrones. In 2015, he began providing the voice of John Tracy in ITV's remake of Gerry Anderson's puppet series Thunderbirds Are Go (2015–present).

Brodie-Sangster played Newt in the 20th Century Fox Maze Runner trilogy, including The Maze Runner (2014), Maze Runner: The Scorch Trials (2015), and Maze Runner: The Death Cure (2018). In BBC2's 6-part television adaptation of Wolf Hall (on BBC2 from 21 January 2015), Brodie-Sangster portrayed Rafe Sadler, the ward of Thomas Cromwell.

On 24 May 2017, a 15-minute sequel to Love Actually was released with Brodie-Sangster as part of the cast. It was shown on the BBC as part of Comic Relief's Red Nose Day and titled Red Nose Day Actually and brought back a large number of characters from the first film.

In 2017, Brodie-Sangster began portraying Whitey Winn in the 2017 Netflix western drama miniseries Godless, created by Scott Frank. He went on to star in Frank's subsequent Netflix miniseries, The Queen's Gambit (2020), as chess player Benny Watts. Both series were critically acclaimed, and the latter went on to become Netflix's most-watched scripted miniseries.

Brodie Films and Winnet music
Brodie-Sangster established Brodie Films in 2006 with his mother, Tasha Bertram, "to create opportunities in the film industry for new British talent; innovative writers, actors and directors." The company was dissolved in May 2013.

Brodie-Sangster plays bass guitar, and in January 2010 joined the band Winnet, in which his mother provides vocals.

Filmography

Film

Television

Music videos

Audio plays

Awards and nominations

References

External links

 Thomas Brodie-Sangster at Curtis Brown Literary and Talent Agency
 

1990 births
Living people
21st-century English male actors
British male child actors
English male child actors
English male film actors
English male television actors
English male voice actors
Male actors from London
People from Southwark